Highlandale is an unincorporated community located in Leflore County, Mississippi, United States. It is part of the Greenwood, Mississippi micropolitan area.

Highlandale is located on the former Southern Railway and was once home to a depot. The community was also home to a spur track.

A post office operated under the name Hilandale from 1901 to 1904 and under the name Highlandale from 1904 to 1910.

References

Unincorporated communities in Leflore County, Mississippi
Unincorporated communities in Mississippi
Greenwood, Mississippi micropolitan area